Graham Bux is a former Australian rules footballer, who played for the Fitzroy Football Club in the Victorian Football League (VFL).

References

External links

Fitzroy Football Club players
1957 births
Living people
Australian rules footballers from Victoria (Australia)